Temporal is a compilation album by American post-metal band Isis, containing various demo recordings, unreleased tracks and remixes from throughout the band's history. It was released on November 6, 2012, by Ipecac. The compilation includes demos and alternate versions of songs from Oceanic, Panopticon and Wavering Radiant. It also features songs originally from Sawblade EP and Melvins / Isis. The compilation also includes a DVD of all the band's music videos.

The song "Grey Divide", recorded in 2001, was previously unreleased.

Track listing

Personnel
Band members
 Jeff Caxide – bass
 Aaron Harris – drums, audio recording, mixing
 Michael Gallagher – guitar, photography
 Bryant Clifford Meyer – electronics, audio recording
 Aaron Turner – guitar, vocals,  album art, design, photography

References

External links
 Temporal and Temporal: Bonus Tracks at Bandcamp (streamed copies where licensed)

Isis (band) albums
Ipecac Recordings albums
Albums with cover art by Aaron Turner
B-side compilation albums
2012 compilation albums
2012 video albums